Shiragaia is a monotypic genus of Asian ground spiders containing the single species, Shiragaia taeguensis. It was first described by K. Y. Paik in 1992, and has only been found in Korea.

References

Gnaphosidae
Monotypic Araneomorphae genera
Spiders of Asia